Aybüke Pusat (born 25 February 1995) is a Turkish actress, ballet dancer, model and beauty pageant titleholder who was crowned Miss Earth Turkey 2014 and was supposed to represent her country at the Miss Earth 2014 pageant. Her maternal family is of Tatar descent (a Turkic ethnic subgroup). She graduated from ballet department of Hacettepe University Ankara State Conservatory. Also, she is studying distance education in business department of Anadolu University.

Miss Earth 2014
By winning Miss Earth Turkey, Pusat was supposed to fly to the Philippines in November to compete with almost 100 other candidates to be Alyz Henrich's successor as Miss Earth.

Acting career
Pusat made her debut appearance in the popular TV series Medcezir as a supporting role in 2014. She then went on to play a series of supporting roles in comedy series Beş Kardeş (2015) and O Hayat Benim (2015–16). In 2016, she was offered a leading role in the comedy series Familya where she plays Su Beyoğlu, the only daughter of the Beyoğlu family, who along with her siblings, tries to mend things in their family after the death of their mother. 

She rose to fame in 2017 for playing the headstrong, resilient female lead Dr. Bahar Kutlu in two seasons of Söz, one of Turkey's most popular and internationally acclaimed action drama, alongside Tolga Sarıtaş, who was nominated for an International Emmy Award (Best Performance by an Actor) for his role. In 2018, she went on to star in a leading role in Şahin Tepesi, an adaptation of the widely acclaimed US TV series Falcon Crest. However, Şahin Tepesi enjoyed a short run due to low local viewership ratings. 

In 2019, she took on a supporting role in the film Kapı, alongside Kadir İnanır, Vahide Perçin, Erdal Beşikçioğlu. In the same year, she starred alongside Furkan Andıç in the romantic comedy Her Yerde Sen where she plays Selin Sever, a lively and intelligent interior architect who was forced to share a house with Andıç's character Demir Erendil, who was also her boss. Her Yerde Sen received international recognition and high praise after having won a Golden Lens Award from the Journalists' Association for its impeccable storytelling, directing, and cinematography. In 2020, both Pusat and Andıç won the Pantene Golden Butterfly Award for Best TV Couple. Subsequently, Her Yerde Sen was the only Turkish production to be named in The Guardians list of 52 Romantic Comedies for Valentine's Day 2021. 

Following the success of Her Yerde Sen, Pusat was cast as the female lead in the Netflix dark comedy 50M2 alongside Engin Öztürk. She was subsequently cast in another BluTV original Alef: Mâl-i Hülya (the second instalment of the Alef series) with Medcezir co-star Taner Ölmez, as well as the BeIN original Hayaller ve Hayatlar alongside an ensemble cast including Özge Gürel, Melisa Aslı Pamuk, Serkay Tütüncü, Yusuf Çim and Ekin Mert Daymaz.

Filmography

Film

Web series

TV series

References

External links
Official Miss Turkey website

Living people
Turkish beauty pageant winners
Models from Istanbul
1994 births
Crimean Tatar models
Turkish people of Crimean Tatar descent
Actresses from Istanbul